Sarah Beth Tomberlin (born April 6, 1995), known mononymously as Tomberlin, is an American contemporary folk musician and singer-songwriter based in Louisville, Kentucky.

Early life
Tomberlin was born in Jacksonville, Florida, but moved five different times before her family ended up residing in Fairfield, Illinois, where her father became a preacher at a local Baptist church. At age 16, Tomberlin finished high school and attended college for a short period, before dropping out, when she began writing songs for her first album.

Career
Tomberlin released her debut studio album in 2018 on Saddle Creek Records, titled At Weddings. The album was positively received by numerous publications. On August 18, 2020, she announced a new EP called Projections, due out October 16, 2020, alongside the release of a Busy Philipps-directed music video for the song "Wasted".

In February 2022, Tomberlin announced her second studio album titled i don't know who needs to hear this..., which was released on April 29, 2022. The album was met with critical acclaim upon its release.

Tomberlin is currently the UK, and EU starter act for Angel Olsen, on her tour in support of her sixth studio album Big Time (2022).

Influences
Growing up, the first albums that Tomberlin owned were the soundtrack to the musical film Chicago (2002), Dashboard Confessional's The Places You Have Come to Fear the Most (2001), and Bright Eyes's I'm Wide Awake, It's Morning (2005).

Discography

Studio albums
 At Weddings (2018)
i don't know who needs to hear this... (2022)

EPs
 Projections (2020)
 Sunstruck (2022)

Remixes 

 Hours (Katie Dey remix), (2020)
 Hours (draag me remix), (2020)

References

External links

Living people
Folk musicians from Kentucky
People from Wayne County, Illinois
Saddle Creek Records artists
Musicians from Jacksonville, Florida
American women singer-songwriters
1995 births
21st-century American women
21st-century American singers
Singer-songwriters from Florida